Talat Iqbal Mahesar is a Pakistani politician who was a member of the National Assembly of Pakistan from 2008 to 2013.

Political career
He ran for the seat of the National Assembly of Pakistan from Constituency NA-233 (Dadu-III) as an independent candidate in 2002 Pakistani general election, but was unsuccessful. He received 269 and lost the seat to Liaquat Ali Jatoi. In the same election, he ran for the seat of the Provincial Assembly of Sindh as an independent candidate from Constituency PS-77 (Dadu-VII) but was unsuccessful. He received 99 votes and lost the seat to Sadaqat Ali Jatoi, a candidate of Pakistan Muslim League (Q) (PML-Q).

He was elected to the National Assembly from Constituency NA-233 (Dadu-II) as a candidate of Pakistan Peoples Party (PPP) in 2008 Pakistani general election. He received 83,493 votes and defeated Ihsan Ali Jatoi, a candidate of PML-Q.

References

Living people
Pakistani MNAs 2008–2013
Year of birth missing (living people)